Nepytia phantasmaria, the phantom hemlock looper, is a species of geometrid moth in the family Geometridae. It was described by Herman Strecker in 1899 and is found in North America.

The MONA or Hodges number for Nepytia phantasmaria is 6907.

References

 Scoble, Malcolm J., ed. (1999). Geometrid Moths of the World: A Catalogue (Lepidoptera, Geometridae), 1016.

Further reading

 Arnett, Ross H. (2000). American Insects: A Handbook of the Insects of America North of Mexico. CRC Press.

External links

 Butterflies and Moths of North America
 NCBI Taxonomy Browser, Nepytia phantasmaria

Ourapterygini